Chandra Bahadur Thapa Magar(), a.k.a. 'Sagar', was a Nepalese politician, belonging to the then Communist Party of Nepal (Maoist). Thapa was the Kathmandu valley in-charge of the Young Communist League. During the people's war period, he was the commander of the Dinesh-Ramji Smriti Brigade of the People's Liberation Army. In the 2008 Constituent Assembly election he was elected from the Gulmi-3 constituency, winning 16581 votes. Then he left communist ideology and joined Tribhuvan University Kirtipur based socio-academic movement called "Aarthik Krantiko Abhiyan". The movement which was led by KP Bhusal, the then Tribhuvan University student who is now known as one of the Nepalese motivational speakers.

References

Year of birth missing (living people)
Living people
Nepalese atheists
Communist Party of Nepal (Maoist Centre) politicians
People of the Nepalese Civil War

Members of the 1st Nepalese Constituent Assembly